James F. Allen may refer to:

James F. Allen (computer scientist) (born 1950), professor of computer science
James F. Allen (businessman) (born 1960s), with Hard Rock International and Seminole Gaming